1001 Movies You Must See Before You Die is a film reference book edited by Steven Jay Schneider with original essays on each film contributed by over 70 film critics. It is a part of a series designed and produced by Quintessence Editions, a London-based company, and published in English-language versions by Cassell Illustrated (UK), ABC Books (the publishing division of Australian Broadcasting Corporation), and Barron's (US). The first edition was published in 2003. The most recent edition was published on 
14 December 2021. Contributors include Adrian Martin, Jonathan Rosenbaum, Richard Peña, David Stratton, and Margaret Pomeranz.

Each title is accompanied by a brief synopsis and critique, some with photographs. Presented chronologically, the 14th edition begins with Georges Méliès' A Trip to the Moon from 1902 and ends in 2020 with Chloé Zhao's Nomadland.

The book has been popular in Australia, where it was the seventh best-selling book in the country for a week in April 2004 and was promoted alongside the presentation of the Australian Broadcasting Corporation's My Favourite Film special.

Statistics

Most nominated directors

Most nominated countries

Contributors
Jason Solomons, who writes movie columns for The Observer and The Mail on Sunday, wrote the foreword. As of the 5th anniversary edition, over 70 critics contributed essays (of up to 500 words), including: Geoff Andrew, Linda Badley, Kathryn Bergeron, Garrett Chaffin-Quiway, Roumiana Deltcheva, Nezih Erdogan, Jean-Michel Frodon, Chris Fujiwara, Tom Gunning, Ernest Hardy, Aniko Imre, Kyung Hyun Kim, Frank Lafond, Adrian Martin, Kim Newman, Devin Orgeron, Marsha Orgeron, Richard Peña, Margaret Pomeranz, Jonathan Rosenbaum, David Stratton, Adisakdi Tantimedh, Michael Tapper, Sam Umland, Matt Venne, Ginette Vincendeau, Andy Willis, and Josephine Woll.

Editions 
  (cover: Ma Rainey's Black Bottom)
  (cover: Joker)
  (cover: A Star Is Born)
  (cover: Blade Runner 2049)
  (cover: Arrival - US / Moonlight - UK)
  (cover: The Revenant)
  (cover: Birdman or (The Unexpected Virtue of Ignorance) in the paperback, a poster montage in the hardcover)
  (cover: Gravity)
  (cover: Life of Pi)
  (cover: Tinker Tailor Soldier Spy)
  (cover: Black Swan – US / Inception – UK)
  (cover: Avatar)
  (cover: The Dark Knight)
  (cover: Indiana Jones and the Temple of Doom)
  (cover: Return of the Jedi)
  (cover: The Shining)
  (cover: Psycho / Pulp Fiction)
  (cover: Psycho)
Source: WorldCat

See also 

 List of films considered the best
 1001 Albums You Must Hear Before You Die
 1001 Books You Must Read Before You Die
 1001 Children's Books You Must Read Before You Grow Up
 1001 Video Games You Must Play Before You Die
 1,000 Recordings to Hear Before You Die

References

Further reading

External links 
 1001 Movies You Must See Before You Die from Barron's Educational Series, with A Peek Inside (ten sample essays from the book)
 1001 Movies You Must See Before You Die (All Editions Combined) from IMDB
Top film lists
Film guides
2003 non-fiction books
British books
Cassell (publisher) books